Huron Peak is a high mountain summit of the Collegiate Peaks in the Sawatch Range of the Rocky Mountains of North America.

Mountain
While relatively close to its neighbor peaks, Huron Peak is separated from them by deep cols, resulting in a moderately high topographic prominence.  Nearby to the south are the Three Apostles, a striking group of three thirteen thousand foot peaks.

It was named after the Huron Indians (Wyandot people).

Flight for Life Accident 

On July 9, 1994, a Flight for Life Aérospatiale Eurocopter AS350 rescue helicopter crashed on Huron Peak at approximately 12,200 feet while attempting to rescue a hiker who had suffered a broken ankle.  With numerous search and rescue personnel nearby, the aircraft's pilot Gary McCall attempted to partially land on a 35 degree slope by placing one skid on the uphill side of the mountain. As rescuers stood under the rotors, shielding their faces from flying debris, they reported hearing 'chopping' noises and saw the aircraft's rotors striking the side of the mountain.

The aircraft rolled approximately 800 feet down the mountain face, coming to rest near 11,400 feet. Rescuers scrambled to the wreckage, but pilot Gary McCall and flight nurse Sandy Sigman had been killed. The accident was the first in the history of the Flight for Life program.

The angle between rotor and skid of the helicopter was later determined to be 28 degrees. The National Transportation Safety Board ruled the cause of the accident as: 'Failure of the pilot to assure main rotor clearance from sloping terrain while in a hover. The terrain condition was a related factor.'

References

External links
 
"Huron Peak"  Peakery.com

"Huron Peak"  TopoQuest.
Huron Peak Trail Review with Photos
Accidents in Mountain Rescue Operations

Mountains of Colorado
Mountains of Chaffee County, Colorado
San Isabel National Forest
Fourteeners of Colorado